Sevenia rosa, or Rosa's tree nymph, is a butterfly in the family Nymphalidae found in South Africa.

Wingspan: 50–60 mm in males and 52–62 mm in females.

Flight period is recorded as October to January but might be year round.

Larval food is Sapium ellipticum, Maprounes africana and Pseudolachnostylis species.

References

rosa
Butterflies described in 1877
Butterflies of Africa
Taxa named by William Chapman Hewitson